Burkina Faso competed at the 2013 World Aquatics Championships in Barcelona, Spain from 19 July to 4 August 2013.

Swimming

Burkina Faso qualified 4 quota places for the following swimming events:

Men

Women

References

External links
Barcelona 2013 Official Site

Nations at the 2013 World Aquatics Championships
2013
World Aquatics Championships